de Moivre's theorem may be:
de Moivre's formula, a trigonometric identity 
Theorem of de Moivre–Laplace, a central limit theorem

Mathematics disambiguation pages